Annie Armstrong is a former Irish republican politician.

Armstrong moved to Twinbrook, Belfast in 1974 and became a community worker in 1981.  At the 1993 Northern Ireland local elections, she was elected for Sinn Féin to represent Dunmurry Cross on Lisburn City Council.

At the Northern Ireland Forum election in 1996, Armstrong was placed fourth on the Sinn Féin list for West Belfast, but was elected in their best result in Northern Ireland.  She did not defend her council seat in 1997, and did not stand for the Northern Ireland Assembly in 1998.

Outside politics, Armstrong established the Colin Community Forum, Colin Community Restorative Justice, Colin Health for All and Cumann na Fuiseoige GAA.  She became a Director of Lisburn Strategic Partnership and the Colin Neighbourhood Initiative, and works as a Community Safety Project Worker with the Northern Ireland Association for the Care and Resettlement of Offenders.  In 2008, she was appointed as an independent member of the District Policing Partnership.

References

Year of birth missing (living people)
Living people
Members of the Northern Ireland Forum
Sinn Féin politicians
20th-century politicians from Northern Ireland
Sinn Féin councillors in Northern Ireland
Members of Lisburn City Council
Women councillors in Northern Ireland